In 21 July 2017, a large earthquake measuring 6.6 on the moment magnitude scale struck right near Bodrum, a popular town of tourism in Turkey, killing 2 and injuring hundreds. Mostly referenced as the 2017 Bodrum-Kos earthquake, this earthquake generated a tsunami which was one of the largest tsunamis in the Mediterranean Sea region.

Tectonic setting

The Eastern Mediterranean which the earthquake can be found in is an area of very complex tectonics related to the collision of three major tectonic plates including the Eurasian Plate, African Plate and the Arabian Plate. Many types of continental collision occur here, including the subduction of the African Plate lithosphere under the Eurasian Plate (more specifically, the Aegean Plate and the Anatolian Plate), the transform boundary between the African Plate & Arabian Plate  which forms the Dead Sea Transform capable of large quakes and the convergent boundary separating the Aegean and Anatolian Plate.

More specifically, the Aegean region, one of the most seismically and volcanically active and quickly moving regions on Earth, has been deformed under a north-to-south extensional tectonic regime at a rate reaching up to 30-40 mm/yr since the Pliocene geologic period. It is developed on nappes which are filled with Pliocene to Quaternary marine sediments. The depression is bordered by Datça Peninsula to the south, Kos to the west, and Bodrum Peninsula to the northern side. The northern part of the graben is dominated by the Gökova Fault Zone which is one of the most seismically active fault structures in southwestern Anatolia. It is a east-west and northeast-southwest trending arc-shaped fault zone. The Gökova Fault Zone contains a complex fault pattern which could be related to the interaction between deep strike-slip faults and shallower normal faults. According to observed geological markers, the combined offset of the fault zone is about  since the Pliocene period. This suggests a slip rate of the fault of around 0.2 mm/yr. Most faults of the fault zone are underwater while some are visible overground.

Past seismicity
In recent but historical times, a number of large earthquakes have struck the Gökova area due to seismic activity in the fault zone nearby. Historical earthquakes with a record of damage include 412 BC, 227 BC, 199–198 BC, 24 BC, 141 AD, 174 AD, 344 AD, 474 AD, 554 AD, 1493 AD, 1851 AD, 1863 AD and 1869 AD events. In the 1493 event, the city of Bodrum was totally destroyed. In the 20th century, large instrumentally recorded events (events recorded by seismometers or other instruments) include 1933 and 1941 with magnitudes of 6.4 and 6.0 in their respective order.

Earthquake

The event, with a magnitude of  6.6, struck at 1:31 AM overnight in 21 July 2017 at a shallow depth of 7 km, which would prompt shaking as strong as a MMI of VII (Very strong). Focal mechanism solutions of the earthquake insisted that this event was generated by east-west trending normal faulting within the lithosphere of the Eurasian Plate, more specifically in the Aegean Plate. Coulomb stress modeling showed that the earthquake ruptured an area with around  length and  width on a west-southwest to east-northeast direction.

Deformation
Ground deformations and displacements of the main shock faulting were observed via GPS and interferograms. Most of the deformation was observed in Karaada, which is located right near the epicenter.

Tsunami
Relative to the large magnitude and large depth, the earthquake generated a tsunami which was one of the largest ever recorded in the Mediterranean since records began in 426 BC. The tsunami was first picked up by a tide gauge in Bodrum, which measured . In the next few weeks after the main earthquake, field surveys were performed. Many dead fish were found, cars were dragged and boats were damaged.

Damages

Extensive damage took place on the island of Kos, and to a lesser degree in the area around Bodrum. On Kos, the old town was worst affected, with the cathedral, the 18th century Defterdar mosque, and a 14th-century castle being badly damaged. The main harbour had its floor crack as a result of the tremor, and was subsequently declared unsafe for use by government officials, who rerouted all ferries to the smaller port town of Kefalos in west Kos.

Two fatalities were reported on the island, in addition to more than 120 injuries. The two dead were identified as Turkish and Swedish nationals, and were killed when the upper facade of a bar collapsed on top of them. Seven seriously injured people on Kos were flown to hospitals in Athens and Heraklion, including two men from Sweden and Norway in critical condition. Around 360 people were injured in Bodrum, many after jumping out of windows in panic, but none of the injuries were regarded as serious.

See also
 List of earthquakes in Greece
 List of earthquakes in Turkey
 List of earthquakes in 2017
 2014 Aegean Sea earthquake
 2020 Aegean Sea earthquake

References

Sources

External links

2017 earthquakes
2017 in Greece
Earthquakes in Greece
2017
July 2017 events in Europe
Aegean Sea
Tsunamis in Greece
Aegean Sea
2017 disasters in Turkey
2017 disasters in Europe
2017 disasters in Greece